Microvast Holdings, Inc. is a battery manufacturer founded in 2006 and headquartered in Stafford, Texas, that makes lithium-ion batteries for electric vehicles and energy storage systems. It operates manufacturing facilities in the United States, China, Germany, and Mexicali.

History 

Microvast was founded in 2006 in Houston, Texas, along with its Chinese subsidiary, Microvast Power Systems in Huzhou, China.It introduced its first generation of batteries in 2009, with manufacturing starting in 2010 in Huzhou factory.

By March, 2017, it began construction on its "Phase III" production facility in Huzhou.

In 2019, the company, in a joint work with researchers from Argonne National Laboratory won a R&D 100 award for a novel "High-energy density and safe battery system".

In July 2020, Microvast inaugurated its new Germany factory in Ludwigsfelde, with production planned to start in March 2021.

On February 10, 2021, Tennessee officials and Microvast announced that the company will establish a new manufacturing facility in Clarksville to manufacture battery cells, modules and packs, with the production expected to begin in the summer of 2022.

On July 26, 2021, the company went public through a merger with a special-purpose acquisition company.

On November 1, 2021, Microvast opened a new R&D center in Orlando, Florida.

2022 federal grant 
On Oct. 19, 2022 the U.S. Department of Energy released "Bipartisan Infrastructure Law Battery Materials Processing and Battery Manufacturing & Recycling Funding Opportunity Announcement", awarding US$2.8 billion to a number of public and private US companies. The company was awarded US$200 million to support development of a Thermally Stable Polyaramid Separator Manufacturing Plant in Clarksville, Tennessee, in partnership with General Motors. The federal grant generated criticism from U.S. representative Frank Lucas and U.S. senator John Barrasso.

Customers & Partnerships 

Microvast batteries are being used by bus makers, including IVECO, CRRC, Foton, King Long, VDL, Zhongtong Bus, JBM and Wrightbus. With the buses operating in China, England, Germany, Holland, India, New-Zealand, Russia,   South Korea and Sweden.

Other commercial vehicles and passenger cars OEM customers include SAIC, PSA Singapore, FPT, ZF Friedrichshafen, Safra, Cargotec, Gaussin and Oshkosh Corporation.

See also
 List of electric-vehicle-battery manufacturers
 Lithium-titanate battery

References

External links

Auto parts suppliers
Battery manufacturers
Companies listed on the Nasdaq
Electronics companies established in 2006
Electric vehicle battery manufacturers